The Pakubuwono is a residential complex of 11 skyscrapers at Kebayoran Baru in South Jakarta, and 1 Makorewood Tower at Menteng in Central Jakarta. Indonesia. The Pakubuwono Signature is the tallest Pakubuwono apartment, which is also currently the tallest residential building in Indonesia. The tower is 252 meters tall with 52 floors above the ground.

Skyscrapers of The Pakubuwono Development complex are as follows,

See also

 List of tallest buildings in Jakarta
 List of tallest buildings in Indonesia

References

Towers in Indonesia
Skyscrapers in Indonesia
Buildings and structures in Jakarta
Residential skyscrapers in Indonesia
Post-independence architecture of Indonesia
South Jakarta